The First Battle of Canton was fought between British and Chinese forces in Canton, Guangdong Province, China, on 18March 1841 during the First Opium War. The capture led to the hoisting of the Union Jack on the British factory in Canton and the resumption of trade between the British and the Chinese.

Narrative 
Following the Convention of Chuenpi in January 1841, which among other clauses ceded the island of Hong Kong to Great Britain, the furious Qing Daoguang Emperor fired Imperial Commissioner Qishan. In his place the emperor appointed his nephew Yishan as "General-pacifier of the Rebellious" (jìngnì靖逆), with Lungwan (Long Wen,隆文) and Yang Fang as ministerial attaches to assist him. On20 March, British Plenipotentiary Charles Elliot announced the re-opening of trade after negotiations with Yang Fang as Lungwan and Yishan did not arrive in Canton until 14April.

Notes

Bibliography
 
 
 
 

1841 in China
Canton 1
Canton March 1841
March 1841 events